The Lviv Organ Hall is a concert hall located within the Church of St. Mary Magdaline in the city of Lviv, constructed in the 17th century. It is home to one of the largest organs in Ukraine, and hosts concerts of organ, symphonic, and chamber music. It is roughly 800 square meters and size and can hold up to 350 people, hosting roughly thirty performances each month.

History 
The hall resides in the former walls of the St. Maria Magdalene Roman Catholic Church. However, from 1753-1758 the architect Martin Urbank set about renovating the central tower, while later Sebastian Fesinger would add a decorative facade depicting the saints  St Dominic and St Hyacinth. By the end of the 18th century, Austrian authorities had permanently closed the building. It would later be transferred into a women's prison until 1922. 

The Rieger–Kloss styled organ installed within the concert hall was commissioned by Gebrüder Rieger in 1932 and was installed in 1933. During the Soviet period, the concert hall served a variety of purposes, including as a sports hall and dance hall. Until the 1960s, the space was owned by the Polytechnic Institute, but was repurposed by the Lviv Conservatory into the organ hall, a purpose which it retains to this day. 

As an official concert organization, the Lviv House of Organ and Chamber Music was established in 1988.

Organ 
The organ consists of 77 registers, 5 of which are transmission. It has four manuals each with a single pedal. All of the first, second, and third manuals are located on the choir balcony on a specially built concrete platform, while the fourth manual was placed above the sacristy. There are two consoles: one in the choir balcony and one in the chancel.

In 1969, the organ was partially refurbished and reorganized by Gebrüder Rieger. Primarily, the main console was replaced with a three manual version and was situated on a stage. Additionally, the pipes of the organ were restored, with new ones replacing old pipes, and the membranes in the tone channels and relay chambers were replaced.

Pictures

References 

Concert halls in Ukraine
Lviv
Organs (music)